San Francisco de la Montaña is a corregimiento in San Francisco District, Veraguas Province, Panama with a population of 2,283 as of 2010. It is the seat of San Francisco District. Its population as of 1990 was 1,851; its population as of 2000 was 2,221.

References

Corregimientos of Veraguas Province